Paola Cortellesi (born 24 November 1973 in Rome) is an Italian actress, singer, voice actress, and presenter. She has starred in about 20 movies as well as a number of theatrical, television and radio shows.

Biography
Cortellesi debuted in the show business at the age of 13, as a singer for Cacao meravigliao, the jingle of the popular RAI TV show Indietro tutta! by Renzo Arbore. At 19 she began studying as an actress at the "Teatro Blu" in Rome (the same theatre school that Kim Rossi Stuart, Gianmarco Tognazzi, Claudia Gerini, Stefania Rocca, and Claudio Santamaria, among others, have attended).

She began her career in television with the show Macao, presented by Alba Parietti, but eventually reached nationwide popularity as a comic actress in the TV show Mai dire Gol by the Gialappa's Band (2000), which, in particular, showcased her skills at parodying famous people, a genre where she collected some of her most appreciated performances (the latest one being her parody of Milan's mayor Letizia Moratti in the 2010-2011 edition of the popular TV show Zelig).

After Mai dire Gol, Cortellesi has collaborated in several other TV Show of the Mai dire... franchise by Gialappa's Band. Other major performances of Cortellesi on television include the 2004 edition of the San Remo Music Festival and the leading role in the TV movie Maria Montessori: Una vita per i bambini, a biography of Maria Montessori, for which Cortellesi received the "Maximo Award" at the Roma Fiction Fest.

Her career in cinema includes several appreciated performances in comedies and comic movies, including a leading role in Tu la conosci Claudia?, a very popular production starring the comic trio Aldo, Giovanni e Giacomo. In 2008, she was nominated for the David di Donatello award for Best Supporting Actress for her role in the movie Piano, solo by Riccardo Milani. In 2011 she won the David di Donatello for Best Actress for her leading role in Escort in Love.

One of her most appreciated theatrical performances was Gli ultimi saranno gli ultimi ("Last will be last") by Massimiliano Bruno, which has been staged 189 times from 2005 to 2007 in over 50 theatres, and for which Cortellesi has collected a number of awards.

As a singer, Cortellesi has been described by Mina as "one of the best Italian voices" and has cooperated with several notable Italian musicians, including Elio e le Storie Tese, Renato Zero, Claudio Baglioni, Frankie hi-nrg mc, and Neri per Caso. In 2019 she was filmed in the titular role of Petra for the four-part Italian TV crime drama, broadcast from September 2020.

Cortellesi married director Riccardo Milani on 1 October 2011. The couple have a daughter, Laura, born 24 January 2013.

Filmography

Writings
  (both a book and a film)

References

External links

 
 

1973 births
Living people
David di Donatello winners
Italian film actresses
Actresses from Rome
Italian stage actresses
Italian television actresses
21st-century Italian singers
21st-century Italian women singers